Boone Township is one of sixteen townships in Hancock County, Iowa, USA.  As of the 2000 census, its population was 227.

History
Boone Township was organized in 1880.

Geography
According to the United States Census Bureau, Boone Township covers an area of 36.48 square miles (94.48 square kilometers).

Cities, towns, villages
 Corwith (north edge)

Unincorporated towns
 Stilson at 
(This list is based on USGS data and may include former settlements.)

Adjacent townships
 Orthel Township (north)
 Britt Township (northeast)
 Erin Township (east)
 Amsterdam Township (southeast)
 Magor Township (south)
 Lu Verne Township, Kossuth County (southwest)
 Prairie Township, Kossuth County (west)
 Wesley Township, Kossuth County (northwest)

Cemeteries
The township contains Boone Township Cemetery.

Airports and landing strips
 Newbrough Airport

School districts
 Corwith-Wesley Community School District
 West Hancock Community School District

Political districts
 Iowa's 4th congressional district
 State House District 11
 State Senate District 6

References
 United States Census Bureau 2008 TIGER/Line Shapefiles
 United States Board on Geographic Names (GNIS)
 United States National Atlas

External links
 US-Counties.com
 City-Data.com

Townships in Hancock County, Iowa
Townships in Iowa